Eric Sörensen (7 September 1913 – 27 February 1990) was a Swedish equestrian. He competed in two events at the 1948 Summer Olympics.

References

External links
 

1913 births
1990 deaths
Swedish male equestrians
Olympic equestrians of Sweden
Equestrians at the 1948 Summer Olympics
Sportspeople from Linköping
Sportspeople from Östergötland County